Louis de Cardevac, marquis d'Havrincourt (born 20 June 1707 at Havrincourt; died 15 February 1767 in The Hague) was a French nobleman, soldier and diplomat.

Having been promoted Lieutenant-General of the French Army, he was sent as King Louis XV's envoy to London in 1748 before being appointed French Ambassador to Sweden between 1749 and 1763. He was then posted to the Netherlands as French Ambassador.

He married, on 10 June 1737, Antoinette-Barbonne-Thérèse (died 1780 in Paris), only child of Jacques-Vincent de Languet, comte de Gergy, who was French Ambassador to the Doge of Venice. by whom he had four children, including Anne-Gabriel-Pierre de Cardevac, who succeeded him as 2nd Marquis and via his mother as Comte de Gergy etc.

See also 
 List of French Ambassadors to Great Britain

References

External links 
 Aage Friis, Bernstorffske Papirer. Udvalgte Breve og Optegnelser vedrørende Familien Bernstorff i Tiden 1732 til 1835, Copenhagen: Gyldendal 1904.
 François-Alexandre-Aubert de La Chesnaye-Desbois & Badier, Dictionnaire de la noblesse, Paris 1864.

1707 births
1767 deaths
People of the Ancien Régime
French generals
Ambassadors of France to the Netherlands
Knights of Malta
French marquesses
French noble families
Ambassadors of France to Sweden
Ambassadors of France to Great Britain